Ian Gillan may refer to:

Ian Gillan (born 1945), musician most famously with Deep Purple
Ian Gillan Band, band fronted by Ian Gillan
Ian Gillan (football coach), Scottish-born Australian soccer coach
Gillan (band), band fronted by Ian Gillan
Ian Gillan, Tony Iommi & Friends, also known as WhoCares, a musical project co-founded by Ian Gillan and Tony Iommi
Ian Gillan & Tony Iommi: WhoCares, a 2012 album by WhoCares